Cache IQ, Inc. was an Austin, Texas, US-based network computing company which created an inline caching appliance for network-attached storage (NAS). Founded in 2010, the management team included former NetQoS CEO Joel Trammell. The company was reported to have received $5 million in initial funding from angel investors. According to InformationWeek, Cache IQ came out of stealth mode in September 2011.

NetApp acquired Cache IQ in November 2012.

See also
 List of companies based in Austin, Texas

References

External links
Cache IQ's Website
 Cache IQ Startup Profile on Storage Newsletter
 Cache IQ Company Profile on Hoovers

Companies based in Austin, Texas